Catasetum viridiflavum, the green-yellow catasetum, is a species of orchid.

References

viridiflavum